General Sir Thomas Trigge  (c. 1742 – 11 January 1814) was a British army officer who began his career in 1759 during the Seven Years' War, as an ensign in the 12th Regiment of Foot. He remained with the regiment for the next 36 years, and commanded it during the Great Siege of Gibraltar.

In 1795, he was military commander in the West Indies during the French Revolutionary Wars, participating in the capture of Suriname and several Dutch-held Leeward Islands. He later returned to Gibraltar, serving briefly as lieutenant governor. He retired from active service in 1809 and died in London on 11 January 1814, being buried in Westminster Abbey with a monument by John Bacon.

Life

Thomas Trigge was born around 1742 and joined the army as an Ensign in the 12th Regiment of Foot during the Seven Years' War. He served in Germany, including the battles of Minden, Villinghausen and Wilhelmsthal.

Trigge commanded the 12th Regiment during the Great Siege of Gibraltar and was included in a commemorative painting. Charles Holloway, George Koehler and Mackenzie are amongst those recorded as the principal officers serving in the siege which was painted by George Carter for the City of London. The National Portrait Gallery have a gouache sketch but the final painting is at the National Army Museum. He became Lieutenant-Governor of Portsmouth in September 1790 which came with the additional post of General Officer Commanding South-West District from 1793.

While Commander-in-Chief in the West Indies, a joint Army and Navy expedition under Lieutenant-General Trigge and Vice-Admiral Seymour captured Suriname from the Dutch on August 20, 1799. They also captured a French corsair of 20 guns, the Hussard, commanded by Marie-Étienne Peltier. He was at the origin of the Quasi-War decided by Burnel, the governor of French Guiana.

In March 1801, Trigge and Rear-Admiral Duckworth captured St. Martin (a Franco-Dutch possession), St. Bartholomew (Swedish), and St. Thomas, St. John, and St. Croix (Danish). For his successes, he was made a Knight of the Bath.

In May 1802 Prince Edward, Duke of Kent and Strathearn, arrived in Gibraltar as Governor with expectations that he would instil order in the garrison, where the troops were frequently drunken and ill disciplined. The Prince was enthusiastic and keen but his approach did not impress the troops and mutiny ensued. The Prince was able to keep order but he ignored the orders from his brother to return home until he felt that he had issued sufficient new rules. Eventually the Prince left Gibraltar, never to return and although he nominally remained the Governor it was Major General Trigge who was briefly the first in a long line of acting Lieutenant Governors. One of Trigge's first acts as acting Governor was to countermand 35 of the 169 new regulations his predecessor had introduced.

Bibliography 
Tugdual de Langlais, Marie-Étienne Peltier Capitaine corsaire de la République : 1762-1810, Coiffard Éditions, Nantes, 2017, 240 p.

References

|-

|-

|-

1740s births
1814 deaths
Suffolk Regiment officers
68th Regiment of Foot officers
44th Regiment of Foot officers
British Army generals
Governors of Gibraltar
Knights Companion of the Order of the Bath
British Army personnel of the Seven Years' War
British Army personnel of the American Revolutionary War
British Army personnel of the French Revolutionary Wars